The Umbrian regional election of 1985 took place on 12 May 1985.

Events
The Italian Communist Party was by far the largest party. After the election, Germano Marri, the incumbent Communist President, continued to govern the Region at the head of a left-wing coalition with the Italian Socialist Party (Popular Democratic Front). In 1987 Marri was replaced by Francesco Mandarini, a Communist too.

Results

Source: Ministry of the Interior

Elections in Umbria
1985 elections in Italy